Sinogastromyzon minutus is a species of ray-finned fish in the genus Sinogastromyzon. It is endemic to the Red River drainage in northwestern Vietnam. It lives in creeks and small rivers.

References

Sinogastromyzon
Fish of Vietnam
Endemic fauna of Vietnam
Fish described in 1978